The 1944 Tulsa Golden Hurricane football team represented the University of Tulsa during the 1944 college football season. In their fourth year under head coach Henry Frnka, the Golden Hurricane compiled an 8–2 record (0–1 against Missouri Valley Conference opponents) and defeated Georgia Tech in the 1945 Orange Bowl.

Tulsa was ranked #7 in the AP Poll after defeating Texas Tech (34-7) and Ole Miss (47-0), but then lost back-to-back games against Oklahoma State and Iowa Pre-Flight. Later in the season, Tulsa also defeated Arkansas (33-2) and Miami (Florida) (48-2).

Center Felto Prewitt was selected as a first-team All-American by Football News, and guard Ellis Jones was selected as a first-team All-American by Look magazine.

Schedule

Rankings
The AP released their first rankings on October 9, the Golden Hurricane were ranked 13th.

References

Tulsa
Tulsa Golden Hurricane football seasons
Orange Bowl champion seasons
Tulsa Golden Hurricane football